The Indian Rocks Causeway (also called the Indian Rocks Bridge) is a twin-span double-leaf bascule bridge that crosses the Narrows, part of the Gulf Intracoastal Waterway, connecting the barrier islands of Indian Rocks Beach and the mainland of Largo, Florida. The bridge carries Walsingham Road, part of SR 688. The eastbound span of the Indian Rocks Causeway was built in 1958, replacing the original swing bridge built in 1916, and the westbound span was built in 1999.

References

See also 
Dunedin Causeway
Clearwater Memorial Causeway
Sand Key Bridge
Belleair Causeway
Park Boulevard Bridge
Tom Stuart Causeway
John's Pass Bridge
Treasure Island Causeway
Corey Causeway
Pinellas Bayway

Causeways in Florida
Bascule bridges in the United States